Michael K. Moe (born 17 November 1937 in Milwaukee) is an American experimental physicist, specializing in particle physics and nuclear physics. He is known his role in 1987 in the direct detection of two neutrino double beta decay in 82Se. (Indirect detection of two neutrino double beta decay had been done in the 1960s.)

Education and career
Moe received in 1959 his bachelor's degree from Stanford University and in 1965 his Ph.D. under Frederick Reines from Case Western Reserve University.

Moe became at the University of California, Irvine in 1966 an assistant research physicist, in 1968  an assistant professor, in 1973 a research physicist, and retiring in 1997.

He was also involved in the search for the extremely rare (and perhaps nonexistent) neutrino-less double beta decay, for which he published a proposal in 1991; in the 2000s he participated in the search for such decay pursued by SLAC's Enriched Xenon Observatory (EXO).

In 2013 Moe received the Tom W. Bonner Prize in Nuclear Physics.

References

1937 births
Living people
Scientists from Milwaukee
21st-century American physicists
Nuclear physicists
Particle physicists
Stanford University alumni
Case Western Reserve University alumni
University of California, Irvine faculty